Marielli Sfakianaki-Manolidou (born 12 January 1945) is a Greek writer, singer and composer.

Biography
Marielli Sfakianaki was born in Athens, Greece, the daughter of Cretan pianist, composer and musicologist Kostas Sfakianakis. She studied vocal music and graduated from the Athens Conservatory in 1971. Her daughter is composer Tatiana Manolidou.

Works
Sfakianaki composes opera, orchestral and sacred choral music. Selected works include:
To mikro kai to megalo i kai t' antitheta
The MINOS opera
Cretan tale opera

She wrote the novel Echoes which received an award from the Society of Greek Writers in 1984.

References

1945 births
20th-century classical composers
21st-century classical composers
Women classical composers
Greek classical composers
Living people
Music educators
Greek opera composers
Women opera composers
Women music educators
20th-century women composers
21st-century women composers
Musicians from Athens